Samuel Cook (January 22, 1931 – December 11, 1964), known professionally as Sam Cooke, was an American singer and songwriter. Considered one of the most influential soul artists of all time, Cooke is commonly referred to as the "King of Soul" for his distinctive vocals, pioneering contributions to the genre and significance in popular music.

Cooke was born in Clarksdale, Mississippi, and later relocated to Chicago with his family at a young age, where he began singing as a child and joined the Soul Stirrers as lead singer in the 1950s. Going solo in 1957, he released a string of hit songs, including "You Send Me", "A Change Is Gonna Come", "Cupid", "Wonderful World", "Chain Gang", "Twistin' the Night Away", "Bring It On Home to Me", and "Good Times". During his eight-year career, Cooke released 29 singles that charted in the Top 40 of the Billboard Pop Singles chart, as well as 20 singles in the Top Ten of Billboard Black Singles chart.

In 1964, Cooke was shot and killed by the manager of a motel in Los Angeles. After an inquest and investigation, the courts ruled Cooke's death to be a justifiable homicide. His family has since questioned the circumstances of his death.

Cooke's contributions to soul music contributed to the rise of Aretha Franklin, Bobby Womack, Al Green, Curtis Mayfield, Stevie Wonder, Marvin Gaye, and Billy Preston, and popularized the work of Otis Redding and James Brown. AllMusic biographer Bruce Eder wrote that Cooke was "the inventor of soul music", and possessed "an incredible natural singing voice and a smooth, effortless delivery that has never been surpassed".

Cooke was also a central part of the civil rights movement, using his influence and popularity with the White and Black populations to fight for the cause. He was friends with boxer Muhammad Ali, activist Malcolm X and football player Jim Brown, who together campaigned for racial equality.

Early life 

Sam Cooke was born Samuel Cook in Clarksdale, Mississippi, in 1931 (he added the "e" to his last name in 1957 to signify a new start to his life). He was the fifth of eight children of the Rev. Charles Cook, a minister in the Church of Christ (Holiness), and his wife, Annie Mae. One of his younger brothers, L.C. (1932–2017), later became a member of the doo-wop band Johnny Keyes and the Magnificents.

Cooke's family moved to Chicago in 1933. There he attended Doolittle Elementary and Wendell Phillips Academy High School, the same school that Nat "King" Cole had attended a few years earlier. Cooke began his career with his siblings in a group called the Singing Children when he was six years old. He first became known as lead singer with the Highway Q.C.'s when he was a teenager, having joined the group at the age of 14. During this time, Cooke befriended fellow gospel singer and neighbor Lou Rawls, who sang in a rival gospel group.

Career

The Soul Stirrers 

In 1950, Cooke replaced gospel tenor R. H. Harris as lead singer of his gospel group the Soul Stirrers, who had signed with Specialty Records on behalf of the group. Their first recording under Cooke's leadership was the song "Jesus Gave Me Water" in 1951. They also recorded the gospel songs "Peace in the Valley", "How Far Am I from Canaan?", "Jesus Paid the Debt" and "One More River", among many others, some of which he wrote. Cooke was often credited for bringing gospel music to the attention of a younger crowd of listeners, mainly girls who would rush to the stage when the Soul Stirrers hit the stage just to get a glimpse of Cooke.

Billboards 2015 list of "the 35 Greatest R&B Artists Of All Time" includes Cooke, "who broke ground in 1957 with the R&B/pop crossover hit "You Send Me" ... And his activism on the civil rights front resulted in the quiet protest song 'A Change Is Gonna Come'".

Crossover pop success 
Cooke had 30 U.S. top 40 hits between 1957 and 1964, plus three more posthumously. Major hits like "You Send Me", "A Change Is Gonna Come", "Cupid", "Chain Gang", "Wonderful World", "Another Saturday Night", and "Twistin' the Night Away" are some of his most popular songs. Twistin' the Night Away was one of his biggest selling albums. Cooke was also among the first modern Black performers and composers to attend to the business side of his musical career. He founded both a record label and a publishing company as an extension of his careers as a singer and composer. He also took an active part in the Civil Rights Movement.

His first pop/soul single was "Lovable" (1956), a remake of the gospel song "Wonderful". It was released under the alias "Dale Cook" in order not to alienate his gospel fan base; there was a considerable stigma against gospel singers performing secular music. However, it fooled no one—Cooke's unique and distinctive vocals were easily recognized. Art Rupe, head of Specialty Records, the label of the Soul Stirrers, gave his blessing for Cooke to record secular music under his real name, but he was unhappy about the type of music Cooke and producer Bumps Blackwell were making. Rupe expected Cooke's secular music to be similar to that of another Specialty Records artist, Little Richard. When Rupe walked in on a recording session and heard Cooke singing Gershwin, he was quite upset. After an argument between Rupe and Blackwell, Cooke and Blackwell left the label. "Lovable" was never a hit, but neither did it flop, and indicated Cooke's future potential. While gospel was popular, Cooke saw that fans were mostly limited to low-income, rural parts of the country, and sought to branch out. Cooke later admitted he got an endorsement for a career in pop music from the least likely man, his pastor father. "My father told me it was not what I sang that was important, but that God gave me a voice and musical talent and the true use of His gift was to share it and make people happy." Taking the name "Sam Cooke", he sought a fresh start in pop.

In 1957, Cooke appeared on ABC's The Guy Mitchell Show. That same year, he signed with Keen Records. His first hit, "You Send Me", released as the B-side of "Summertime", spent six weeks at No. 1 on the Billboard R&B chart. The song also had mainstream success, spending three weeks at No. 1 on the Billboard pop chart. It elevated him from earning $200 a week to over $5,000 a week.

In 1958, Cooke performed for the famed Cavalcade of Jazz concert produced by Leon Hefflin Sr. held at the Shrine Auditorium on August 3. The other headliners were Little Willie John, Ray Charles, Ernie Freeman, and Bo Rhambo. Sammy Davis Jr. was there to crown the winner of the Miss Cavalcade of Jazz beauty contest. The event featured the top four prominent disc jockeys of Los Angeles.

Cooke signed with the RCA Victor record label in January 1960, having been offered a guaranteed $100,000 by the label's producers Hugo & Luigi. One of his first RCA Victor singles was "Chain Gang", which reached No. 2 on the Billboard pop chart. It was followed by more hits, including "Sad Mood", "Cupid", "Bring It On Home to Me" (with Lou Rawls on backing vocals), "Another Saturday Night", and "Twistin' the Night Away".

In 1961, Cooke started his own record label, SAR Records, with J. W. Alexander and his manager, Roy Crain. The label soon included the Simms Twins, the Valentinos (who were Bobby Womack and his brothers), Mel Carter and Johnnie Taylor. Cooke then created a publishing imprint and management firm named Kags.

Like most R&B artists of his time, Cooke focused on singles; in all, he had 29 top 40 hits on the pop charts and more on the R&B charts. He was a prolific songwriter and wrote most of the songs he recorded. He also had a hand in overseeing some of the song arrangements. In spite of releasing mostly singles, he released a well-received blues-inflected LP in 1963, Night Beat, and his most critically acclaimed studio album, Ain't That Good News, which featured five singles, in 1964.

In 1963, Cooke signed a five-year contract for Allen Klein to manage Kags Music and SAR Records and made him his manager. Klein negotiated a five-year deal (three years plus two option years) with RCA Victor in which a holding company, Tracey, Ltd, named after Cooke's daughter, owned by Klein and managed by J. W. Alexander, would produce and own Cooke's recordings. RCA Victor would get exclusive distribution rights in exchange for 6 percent royalty payments and payments for the recording sessions. For tax reasons, Cooke would receive preferred stock in Tracey instead of an initial cash advance of $100,000. Cooke would receive cash advances of $100,000 for the next two years, followed by an additional $75,000 for each of the two option years if the deal went to term.

Personal life 
Cooke was married twice. His first marriage was to singer-dancer Dolores Elizabeth Milligan Cook, who took the stage name "Dee Dee Mohawk" in 1953; they divorced in 1958. She was killed in an auto collision in Fresno, California in 1959. Although he and Dolores were divorced, Cooke paid for his ex-wife's funeral expenses. She was survived by her son Joey.

In 1958, Cooke married his second wife, Barbara Campbell (1935–2021), in Chicago. His father performed the ceremony. They had three children, Linda (b. 1953), Tracy (b. 1960), and Vincent (1961–1963), who drowned in the family swimming pool. Less than three months after Cooke's death, his widow, Barbara, married his friend Bobby Womack. Barbara and Womack divorced after she discovered Womack was having an affair with Cooke's 17-year-old daughter Linda. Linda married Womack's brother, Cecil Womack and they became the duo Womack & Womack.

Cooke also fathered at least three other children out of wedlock. In 1958, a woman in Philadelphia, Connie Bolling, claimed Cooke was the father of her son. Cooke paid her an estimated $5,000 settlement out of court.

In November 1958, Cooke was involved in a car accident en route from St. Louis to Greenville. His chauffeur Edward Cunningham was killed, while Cooke, guitarist Cliff White, and singer Lou Rawls were hospitalized.

Death 

Cooke was killed at the age of 33 on December 11, 1964, at the Hacienda Motel, in South Central Los Angeles, California, located at 91st and South Figueroa Street. Answering separate reports of a shooting and a kidnapping at the motel, police found Cooke's body. He had sustained a gunshot wound to the chest, which was later determined to have pierced his heart.

The motel's manager, Bertha Franklin, said she shot him in self-defense. Her account was immediately disputed by Cooke's acquaintances. The motel's owner, Evelyn Carr, said that she had been on the telephone with Franklin at the time of the incident. Carr said she overheard Cooke's intrusion and the ensuing conflict and gunshot and called the police.

The police record states that Franklin fatally shot Cooke, who had checked in earlier that evening. Franklin said that Cooke had banged on the door of her office, shouting "Where's the girl?!", in reference to Elisa Boyer, a woman who had accompanied Cooke to the motel, and who had called the police that night from a telephone booth near the motel minutes before Carr had.

Cooke was struck once in the torso. According to Franklin, he exclaimed, "Lady, you shot me," in a tone that expressed perplexity rather than anger, before advancing on her again. She said she hit him in the head with a broomstick before he finally fell to the floor and died. A coroner's inquest was convened to investigate the incident.

Elisa Boyer said she ran first to the manager's office and knocked on the door seeking help. However, she said that the manager took too long to respond, so, fearing Cooke would soon be coming after her, she fled from the motel before the manager opened the door. She said she then put her clothes back on, hid Cooke's clothing, went to a telephone booth, and called the police.

Boyer's account is the only one that exists of what happened between her and Cooke that night, and it has long been called into question. Inconsistencies between her version of events and details reported by diners at Martoni's Restaurant, where Cooke dined and drank earlier in the evening, suggest that Boyer may have gone willingly to the motel with Cooke, then slipped out of the room with his clothing to rob him, rather than to escape an attempted rape.

According to restaurant employees and friends, Cooke was carrying a large amount of money at Martoni's. However, a search of Boyer's purse by police revealed nothing except a $20 bill, and a search of Cooke's Ferrari found only a money clip with $108, as well as a few loose coins near the ashtray.

In addition, because Carr's testimony corroborated Franklin's version of events, and because both Boyer and Franklin later passed polygraph tests, the coroner's jury ultimately accepted Franklin's explanation and returned a verdict of justifiable homicide. With that verdict, authorities officially closed the case on Cooke's death.

Some of Cooke's family and supporters, however, have rejected Boyer's version of events, as well as those given by Franklin and Carr. They believe that there was a conspiracy to murder Cooke and that the murder occurred in some manner entirely different from the three official accounts.

On the perceived lack of an investigation, Cooke's close friend Muhammad Ali said: "If Cooke had been Frank Sinatra, the Beatles or Ricky Nelson, the FBI would be investigating".

Singer Etta James viewed Cooke's body before his funeral and questioned the accuracy of the official version of events. She wrote that the injuries she observed were well beyond the official account of Cooke having fought Franklin alone. James wrote that Cooke was so badly beaten that his head was nearly separated from his shoulders, his hands were broken and crushed, and his nose mangled.

Some have speculated that Cooke's manager, Allen Klein, had a role in his death. Klein owned Tracey Ltd, which ultimately owned all rights to Cooke's recordings. However, no concrete evidence supporting a criminal conspiracy has been presented.

Aftermath 

The first funeral service for Cooke was held on December 18, 1964, at A. R. Leak Funeral Home in Chicago; 200,000 fans lined up for more than four city blocks to view his body. Afterward, his body was flown back to Los Angeles for a second service, at the Mount Sinai Baptist Church on December 19, which included a much-heralded performance of "The Angels Keep Watching Over Me" by Ray Charles, who stood in for a grief-stricken Bessie Griffin. Cooke was interred at Forest Lawn Memorial Park Cemetery in Glendale, California.

Two singles and an album were released in the month after his death. One of the singles, "Shake", reached the top ten of both the pop and R&B charts. The B-side, "A Change Is Gonna Come", is considered a classic protest song from the era of the civil rights movement. It was a Top 40 pop hit and a top 10 R&B hit. The album, also titled Shake, reached the number one spot for R&B albums.

Bertha Franklin said she received numerous death threats after shooting Cooke. She left her position at the Hacienda Motel and did not publicly disclose where she had moved. After being cleared by the coroner's jury, she sued Cooke's estate, citing physical injuries and mental anguish suffered as a result of Cooke's attack. Her lawsuit sought $200,000 in compensatory and punitive damages. Barbara Womack countersued Franklin on behalf of the estate, seeking $7,000 in damages to cover Cooke's funeral expenses. Elisa Boyer provided testimony in support of Franklin in the case. In 1967, a jury ruled in favor of Franklin on both counts, awarding her $30,000 in damages.

Legacy

Portrayals 
Cooke was portrayed by Paul Mooney in The Buddy Holly Story, a 1978 American biographical film which tells the life story of rock musician Buddy Holly.

In the stage play One Night in Miami, first performed in 2013, Cooke is portrayed by Arinzé Kene. In the 2020 film adaptation, he is played by Leslie Odom Jr., who was nominated for the Academy Award for Best Supporting Actor for his portrayal.

Posthumous honors 
 In 1986, Cooke was inducted as a charter member of the Rock and Roll Hall of Fame.
 In 1987, Cooke was inducted into the Songwriters Hall of Fame.
 In 1989, Cooke was inducted a second time to the Rock and Roll Hall of Fame when the Soul Stirrers were inducted.
 On February 1, 1994, Cooke received a star on the Hollywood Walk of Fame for his contributions to the music industry, located on 7051 Hollywood Boulevard.
 Although Cooke never won a Grammy Award, he received the Grammy Lifetime Achievement Award in 1999, presented by Larry Blackmon of funk super-group Cameo.
 In 2004, Rolling Stone ranked Cooke 16th on its list of the "100 Greatest Artists of All Time".
 In 2008, Cooke was named the fourth "Greatest Singer of All Time" by Rolling Stone.
 In 2008, Cooke received the first plaque on the Clarksdale Walk of Fame, located at the New Roxy theater.
 In 2009, Cooke was honored with a marker on the Mississippi Blues Trail in Clarksdale.
 In June 2011, the city of Chicago renamed a portion of East 36th Street near Cottage Grove Avenue as the honorary "Sam Cooke Way" to remember the singer near a corner where he hung out and sang as a teenager. Many of his family was also in attendance, as many of them are living in the Chicago area.
 In 2013, Cooke was inducted into the National Rhythm and Blues Music Hall of Fame in Cleveland, Ohio, at Cleveland State University. The founder of the National Rhythm & Blues Hall of Fame, LaMont Robinson, said he was the greatest singer ever to sing.
 The words "A change is gonna come" from the Sam Cooke song of the same name are on a wall of the Contemplative Court, a space for reflection in the Smithsonian's National Museum of African American History and Culture; the museum opened in 2016.
 Cooke is inducted into the Mississippi Musicians Hall of Fame.
 In 2020, Dion released a song and music video as a tribute to Cooke called "Song for Sam Cooke (Here in America)" (featuring Paul Simon) from his album Blues with Friends. American Songwriter magazine honored "Song for Sam Cooke" as the "Greatest of the Great 2020 Songs".
 In 2023, Cooke was named the third "Greatest Singer of All Time" by Rolling Stone.

Discography 

 Sam Cooke (1958)
 Encore (1958)
 Tribute to the Lady (1959)
 Cooke's Tour (1960)
 Hits of the 50's (1960)
 Swing Low (1961)
 My Kind of Blues (1961)
 Twistin' the Night Away (1962)
 Mr. Soul (1963)
 Night Beat (1963)
 Ain't That Good News (1964)

Notes

References

Further reading 
 
 Our Uncle Sam: The Sam Cooke Story from His Family's Perspective by Erik Greene (2005) 
 You Send Me: The Life and Times of Sam Cooke by Daniel Wolff, S. R. Crain, Clifton White, and G. David Tenenbaum (1995) 
 One More River to Cross: The Redemption of Sam Cooke by B. G. Rhule (2012)

External links 

 Sam Cooke (ABKCO Homepage)
 
 
 
 "Black Elvis" by The Village Voice
 

 
1931 births
1964 deaths
African-American male singer-songwriters
Activists for African-American civil rights
African-American rock musicians
African-American rock singers
American gospel singers
American male pop singers
American rhythm and blues musicians
American rhythm and blues singers
American rock musicians
American rock singers
American soul musicians
American soul singers
Grammy Lifetime Achievement Award winners
Keen Records artists
RCA Victor artists
Specialty Records artists
Death conspiracy theories
Deaths by firearm in California
Justifiable homicide
Musicians from Clarksdale, Mississippi
Singers from Chicago
Singer-songwriters from Mississippi
Burials at Forest Lawn Memorial Park (Glendale)
African-American activists

Mississippi Blues Trail
20th-century African-American male singers
Singer-songwriters from Illinois